Yelena Vorona (born 3 December 1976) is a Russian freestyle skier. She competed at the 1998 Winter Olympics and the 2002 Winter Olympics.

References

External links
 

1976 births
Living people
Russian female freestyle skiers
Olympic freestyle skiers of Russia
Freestyle skiers at the 1998 Winter Olympics
Freestyle skiers at the 2002 Winter Olympics
Skiers from Moscow